Hoàng Trung Trọng (1922 in Hải Dương – 16 July 1998 in United States) was a Vietnamese songwriter.

References

Vietnamese songwriters
1922 births
1998 deaths